Phyllonorycter mariaeella is a moth of the family Gracillariidae. It is known from Canada (Québec and Ontario) and the United States (Missouri and Michigan).

The wingspan is 8-8.5 mm.

The larvae feed on Symphoricarpos species, including Symphoricarpos orbiculatus, Symphoricarpos symphoricarpos and Symphoricarpos vulgaris. They mine the leaves of their host plant. The mine has the form of a blotch mine on the underside of the leaf. Pupation takes place within an ovoid white silken cocoon.

References

External links
Phyllonorycter at microleps.org
mothphotographersgroup

mariaeella
Moths of North America
Moths described in 1875